Sartre is a French-language occupational surname. It derives from late Latin sartor, tailor.

The surname may refer to:
Jean-Paul Sartre (1905–1980), French existentialist philosopher
Arlette Elkaïm-Sartre (1935–2016), French writer, adoptive daughter of Jean-Paul Sartre
 (born 1947), French historian
Duran Sartre de Carpentras, 13th-century French troubadour
 (1760–1831), French politician
Maurice Sartre (born 1944), French historian
Romain Sartre (born 1982), French footballer
 (1902–2000), archbishop of Madagascar

References

French-language surnames